This group of vessels were originally slated to be built to the Sampson designed steam vessel; however, the Admiralty on 9 May 1845, ordered the first pair (Conflict and Desperate) as First-Class screw sloops to be built from a design of Sir William Symonds, Surveyor of the Navy. This design would become known as the Conflict-class sloop. These would be 10-gun vessels with 400 NHP engines. The second pair of vessels (Enchantress and Falcon) were ordered on 26 March 1846 but after their keels were laid at Pembroke Dockyard, their construction was suspended in September 1846 then cancelled five years later, on 4 April 1851. Both completed ships served in the Baltic during the Crimean war, and Desperate briefly served as a store ship to Edward Augustus Inglefield's Arctic expedition. They had both been broken up by 1865.

Conflict was the fourth named vessel since its introduction for a 12-gun gun brig launched by Dudman at Deptford on 17 April 1801 and wrecked on the French Coast on 24 October 1804.

Desperate was the second named vessel since it was introduced for a 12-gun gun brig launched by White at Broadstairs on 2 January 1802, converted to a mortar brig in 1811 and sold on 15 December 1814.

Enchantress was the second named vessel since it was introduced for a 14-gun sloop purchased in 1804, reduced to Harbour service in June 1813 and listed until August 1818.

Falcon was the twenty-second named vessel since it was introduced for a Ballinger dating from 1342 and sold in 1352.

Construction and specifications
Conflict’s keel was laid in July 1845 at Pembroke Dockyard and launched on 5 August 1846 and Desperate’s keel was laid in October 1845 and launched on 23 May 1849. Enchantress’s and Falcon’s keels were laid during 1846; however, both were suspended in September 1846 and finally cancelled on 4 April 1851. Her builder’s measure tonnage was 992 tons.

To facilitate the installation of the screw propeller, Conflict was towed to Wigram’s Yard, Blackwall to be lengthened in early 1848. During the lengthening process the propeller was installed. Desperate was also lengthened prior to launch by Admiralty Order (AO) 13 July 1848. Her builder’s measured tonnage increased to 1,038 tons with a displacement of 1,628 tons.

The machinery was supplied by Maudslay, Sons & Field of Lambeth and Seaward & Capel of Millwall, London.  Both vessels would ship two rectangular fire tube boilers. The Seaward horizontal single expansion (HSE) engine installed in Conflict had four cylinders of 45 inches in diameter with a 24-inch stroke. Her screw propeller was 13.5 feet in diameter. The Maudslay HSE engine in Desperate had four cylinders of 55 inches in diameter with a 30-inch stroke. Her screw propeller was only 13 feet in diameter. Both engines were rated at 400 nominal horsepower (NHP).

The armament consisted of a pair of Monk’s 1839 56-pounder muzzle loading smooth bore (MLSB) of 87 hundredweight (cwt) 10-foot solid shot gun on pivot mounts, six 8-inch 65 cwt MLSB 9-foot shell guns plus two 32-pounder 25 cwt MLSB solid shot guns on broadside trucks.
In 1857 The armament was changed to one 68-pounder 95 cwt MLSB 10-foot solid shot gun and one 10-inch 85 cwt MLSB 9-foot 4-inch shell gun on a pivot mount and six 8-inch 65 cwt MLSB 9-foot shell guns on broadside trucks.

Trials
During trials Conflict’s engine generated  indicated horsepower (IHP) for a speed of 9.378 knots. The trial runs for Desperate, her engine generated 699  IHP for a speed of 9.432 knots.

Conflict was completed for sea on 20 November 1849 at a cost of: Hull – £20,496; machinery – £21,514; lengthening – £5,410; and fitting – £11,088.

Desperate was completed for sea on 9 May 1853 at a cost of £57,740 (including machinery of £21,007).

Ships

Notes

References

Rif Winfield; British Warships in the Age of Sail (1817 - 1863): published by Seaforth Publishing, England (c) 2014; eISBN 9781473837430

Ships built in Pembroke Dock
 Conflict
Sloops of the Royal Navy
Sloop classes